Brochiloricaria macrodon is a species of armored catfish endemic to Brazil where it is found in the Paraguay River basin.  This species grows to a length of  SL.

References
 

Loricariini
Fish of South Africa
Fish of Brazil
Endemic fauna of Brazil
Taxa named by Rudolf Kner
Fish described in 1853